Kevin Halligan is a Canadian poet and writer who was born in 1964. His notable works include The Cockroach and his poetry collection Utopia.  Many of his individual poems were published in the Times Literary Supplement from 1998 to 2006.

References

20th-century Canadian poets
20th-century Canadian male writers
Canadian male poets
21st-century Canadian poets
1964 births
Living people
21st-century Canadian male writers